Streptanthus hyacinthoides is a species of flowering plant in the mustard family known by the common name smooth jewelflower. It is found in Texas, Arkansas, Oklahoma, Louisiana and Nebraska, occurring in prairies, grasslands, and roadsides. The specific name hyacinthoides is Greek, referring to the resemblance of the species to the genus Hyacinthus, and the common name "smooth jewelflower" refers to the glabrous stems of the plant.

Description

The sessile or nearly sessile leaves are linear to lanceolate. The actinomorphic flowers are clustered in crowded racemes. The sepals are purple and the four petals of each flower are purple or white with purple veins.

References

Streptanthus
Plants described in 1836